Beermann is a German surname. Notable people with the surname include:

 Frank Beermann (born 1965), German conductor
 Janine Beermann (born 1983), German field hockey player
 Maik Beermann (born 1981), German politician
 Ralph F. Beermann (1912–1977), American politician
 Timo Beermann (born 1990), German footballer

German-language surnames